Lin Tin Htay (born 13 July 1985) is a Burmese politician who has been the MP of the Amyotha Hluttaw for Mon State No. 4 constituency. He is a member of the National League for Democracy.

Early life and education
Lin Tin Htay was born on 13 July 1985 in Chaungzon Township, Mon State, Myanmar. He is an ethnic Mon. He graduated with BSc (Maths) from Mawlamyaing University. He worked an officer at union election commection office. He had served as charge of township NLD youth and as member of the local villages.

Political career
He is a member of the National League for Democracy. In the 2015 Myanmar general election, he was elected as an Amyotha Hluttaw MP from Mon State No. 4 parliamentary constituency, winning a majority of 21626 votes.

References

Living people
1985 births
People from Mon State
Members of the House of Nationalities
National League for Democracy politicians